The 2010 New York State Senate elections were held on November 2, 2010 to elect representatives from all 62 State Senate districts in the U.S. state of New York. Primary elections were held on September 14, 2010. Republicans retook the Senate majority, winning 32 seats to the Democrats' 30 on Election Day. 

One Republican Senate incumbent, Senator Frank Padavan of Queens, was defeated, while four Democratic incumbents (Sens. Brian Foley, Antoine Thompson, Darrel Aubertine, and Craig Johnson) were defeated in the general election.  Democratic candidate David Carlucci was elected to an open seat in Senate District 38 that had become vacant due to the July 2010 death of Republican Senator Thomas Morahan. Incumbent Democrat William Stachowski was defeated by Timothy M. Kennedy in a Democratic primary in Senate District 58, and Kennedy prevailed in the general election. The Republicans' takeover of control of the State Senate was not confirmed until Johnson, who had sought a full hand recount of his race, exhausted his final court appeal on December 20, 2010.

District 1

District 2

District 3

District 4

District 5

District 6

District 7

District 8

District 9

District 10

District 11

District 12

District 13

District 14

District 15

District 16

District 17

District 18

District 19

District 20

District 21

District 22

District 23

District 24

District 25

District 26

District 27

District 28

District 29

District 30

District 31

District 32

District 33

District 34

District 35

District 36

District 37

District 38

District 39

District 40

District 41

District 42

District 43

District 44

District 45

District 46

District 47

District 48

District 49

District 50

District 51

District 52

District 53

District 54

District 55

District 56

District 57

District 58

District 59

District 60

District 61

District 62

References

External links
 Recertified 2010 New York State Senate Election Results

New York State Senate elections
2010 New York (state) elections
New York State Senate